St John's Gardens may refer to the following:

St John's Gardens, Cardiff, Wales, formerly part of the graveyard of St John's church
St John's Gardens, Liverpool, England, a public space in the city centre
St John's Gardens, Manchester, England, formerly the site of St John's church and graveyard
St John's Gardens, part of the church of St John Clerkenwell, London